Frank Moore (1828–1904)
was an American journalist and compiler, a brother of George Henry Moore.  He was born in Concord, New Hampshire, but removed to New York City and became a journalist and general writer.  In 1869-72 he was Assistant Secretary of Legation in Paris.  He edited:  
 Songs and Ballads of the American Revolution (1856)
 Cyclopedia of American Eloquence (1857)
 Diary of the American Revolution (two volumes, 1860)
 The Rebellion Record (twelve volumes, 1861-68), a collection of original material bearing on the Civil War
 The Patriot Preachers of the American Revolution (1862)
 Lyrics of Loyalty (1864)
 Songs of the Soldiers (New York: George P. Putnam, 1864)
 Confederate Rhymes and Rhapsodies (1864)
 Personal and Political Ballads (1864)
 Speeches of Andrew Johnson (1865)
 Life and Speeches of John Bright (1865)
 Anecdotes, Poetry, and Incidents of the War: North and South: 1860-1865 (1866)
 Women in the War, 1861-66 (1866)
 Songs and Ballads of the Southern People, 1861-65 (1887)
 The Civil War in Song and Story, 1860-1865 (New York: P. F. Collier, 1889)

The Rebellion Record
Twelve volumes reporting on the American Civil War were published by David Van Nostrand. Each volume contains a diary of events, documents and narratives, and poetry. Most are now available from Internet Archive:
 First Volume: Introductory address by Edward Everett, Volume 1 (1861)
 Second Volume: Volume 2
 Third Volume: Volume 3
 Fourth Volume: Volume 4
 Fifth Volume: Volume 5
 Eighth Volume: Volume 8
 Ninth Volume: Volume 9

References

External links
 
 

1828 births
1904 deaths
American male journalists
Historians from New York (state)
Journalists from New York City
People from Concord, New Hampshire